Ponder Peak is a peak rising to  at the head of Repeater Glacier in the northeastern Asgard Range, McMurdo Dry Valleys. It was named by the New Zealand Geographic Board in 1998 after W. Frank Ponder, the architect who designed Scott Base for occupation in the 1957 International Geophysical Year and for the Commonwealth Trans-Antarctic Expedition.

References

Mountains of the Asgard Range
McMurdo Dry Valleys